Kill Me in the Morning is the only studio album by the post-punk band Float Up CP, whose members had previously been in the group Rip Rig and Panic. The album was released in December 1985 by Rough Trade Records.

Track listing

Personnel 
Adapted from the Kill Me in the Morning liner notes.

Float Up CP
 Neneh Cherry – vocals
 Ollie Moore – saxophone
 Sean Oliver – bass guitar, backing vocals, production
 Gareth Sager – guitar, keyboards, vocals, production
 Bruce Smith – drums

Additional musicians
 David Defries – trumpet (B5)
 Derek Goddard – drums (B5)
 Sarah Sarahandi – violin
Production and additional personnel
 Dennis Bovell – co-producer (A2)
 Francis DeSouza – mastering
 Martin Rex – engineering

Charts

Release history

References

External links 
 

1985 debut albums
Rough Trade Records albums